Alaba may refer to:

 Alaba (gastropod), a sea snails genus in the family Litiopidae
 Alaba, Amharic -foundation, main. It also refers to the land lord.
 Halaba people or Halaba, an ethnic group in Ethiopia
 Halaba special woreda, a district in Ethiopia, named after the Halaba people
 Halaba Kulito, the administrative center of that district
 Alaba-K’abeena language, a language spoken in Ethiopia by the Alaba
 David Alaba (born 1992), Austrian footballer
 The Basque name for the Spanish commune of Álava-Araba